The McLaren MP4-20 is a Formula One racing car that was built by McLaren for the 2005 Formula One season. The chassis was designed by Adrian Newey, Paddy Lowe, Pat Fry, Mike Coughlan and Peter Prodromou with Mario Illien designing the bespoke Ilmor engine. The car was driven by Kimi Räikkönen and Juan Pablo Montoya. The MP4-20 was the last McLaren car to be powered by Mercedes-Benz under the Ilmor partnership since the 1995 season.

Livery 
McLaren-Mercedes went into 2005 with renewed major sponsorships such as West, Mobil 1, Mercedes-Benz, SAP, Siemens, Hugo Boss, Sun Microsystems, AT&T, Schüco and Henkel Corporation. The team also received new sponsorship with Johnnie Walker replacing West due to the tobacco advertising ban in the European Union on 31 July 2005. The livery was similar to the 2004 design with subtle changes.

McLaren used 'West' logos in the Australian, Malaysian, Bahrain, San Marino, Spanish, Monaco, European, United States and German Grands Prix.

New design 
The car's chassis was an almost completely new design after the failure of the MP4-18 and MP4-19. The new car featured the revised aerodynamics and suspension set up that the 2005 regulations required, including a raised front wing, smaller diffuser and rear wing moved further forward. A shorter wheelbase was used to maximise the Michelin tyres' performance. The car featured distinctive 'horn' wings fitted to the bodywork behind the overhead air intake in an attempt to claw back as much downforce as possible lost through the FIA's rule changes. The wide, flat nose design was initially trialled on the MP4-19 at the 2004 Italian Grand Prix, but not retained for the rest of that season. It was fully utilised for 2005.

Season 
The car was fast but unreliable in testing and whilst Kimi Räikkönen used the car as best as he could in the early part of the season, Juan Pablo Montoya (who had joined the team from Williams) initially struggled to get to grips with the setup and unusual driving technique the car required over the Williams chassis he was used to. He was not helped by an off-track injury that put him out for two races early in the year. His stand-ins for those 2 races, Pedro de la Rosa for Bahrain and Alexander Wurz for San Marino finished fifth (including the fastest lap) and third respectively. Montoya eventually settled with the car and scored three wins and several podiums.

The Mercedes engine was the most powerful in F1 that year  but suffered reliability problems which cost Räikkönen the world championship to Fernando Alonso and McLaren the Constructors' Championship to Renault despite McLaren winning 10 races to Renault's 8 wins. Räikkönen won seven races and was in a position to win at least three others but the car's unreliability cost him the title. Montoya also suffered from reliability problems which cost him a potential win in Hungary and potential podium finishes in France and China.

Continual development throughout the year made the MP4-20 the fastest car in F1 from mid-season onwards, as was seen by the number of pole positions and fastest laps accumulated by both Räikkönen and Montoya.

Räikkönen and McLaren eventually finished second in their respective championships, whilst Montoya finished fourth in the drivers' standings.

Complete Formula One results
(key) (results in bold indicate pole position)

† – Driver did not finish the Grand Prix, but were classified as they completed more than 90% of the race distance.

References

McLaren MP4 20
2005 Formula One season cars